Sofía Tartilán ( Sofía Tartilán Rodríguez; after marriage, Sofía Tartilán de Escobar; April 19, 1829 – July 2, 1888) was a 19th-century Spanish novelist, essayist, journalist, and editor. Her name appeared as a regular contributor to much of the high-profile press of her time.

Biography
Sofía Tartilán Rodríguez was born in 1829, in Palencia, Her parents were Félix Tartilán, a native of Guaza de Campos, and Vicenta Rodríguez, a native of Palencia but also  from Benavente. Fifth of six sisters, she grew up in a middle-class family environment. She may have studied at the "Sociedad Económica de Amigos del País de Palencia,", directed by Froilana Almirante. The Tartilán family left Palencia around 1845 and probably moved to Valladolid. After she married Mr. Escobar, the couple settled in Madrid in early 1851.

Tartilán wrote fiction and non-fiction. She contributed to the Seville magazine El Gran Mundo, as well as to El Mediodia de Málaga, and Revista Contemporánea, She was the editor of the newspaper, La Caza (1865-1868) and the magazine, Ecos del Auseva. She served as director of La Ilustración de la Mujer (1873-1876). A militant feminist, Tartilán championed a better education for women. She died in Madrid on July 2, 1888, although others think that she was in Tarancón (Cuenca).

Selected works

Narrative
La lucha del corazón (Madrid, 1874)
Caja de hierro (Madrid, 1874)
La ofrenda de las hadas (Madrid, 1877)
Costumbres populares. Colección de cuentos tomados del natural (Madrid, 1880)
Borrascas del corazón (Madrid, 1884)
La loca de las alas (1884).

Essays
Historia de la crítica (Sevilla, 1875).
Páginas para la educación popular (Madrid, 1877)

References

Attribution
 This article incorporates text from this source, which is in the public domain: Ensayo de un catálogo de periodistas españoles del siglo XIX (1903-1904), a work by Manuel Ossorio and Bernard (1839-1904).

1829 births
1888 deaths
19th-century Spanish novelists
19th-century Spanish journalists
19th-century Spanish women writers
Spanish essayists
Spanish women novelists
Spanish women essayists
People from Palencia
Spanish newspaper editors
Women newspaper editors
19th-century women journalists